Wajihuddin (born 7 June 1980) is a Pakistani first-class cricketer who played for Karachi cricket team.

References

External links
 

1980 births
Living people
Pakistani cricketers
Karachi cricketers
Karachi Port Trust cricketers
Cricketers from Karachi